Slow Wall is a 3 track EP by Fionn Regan which was released under the name "Bilbo".

Track listing 

"Slow Wall" - 4:00
"Rocking Horse Town" - 2:57
"Hello L" - 3:00

References

2000 EPs